Sakalakala Vallavan may refer to:

 Sakalakala Vallavan (1982 film), Indian Tamil-language film
 Sakalakala Vallavan (2015 film), Indian Tamil-language film